The 1994–95 NBA season was the seventh season for the Miami Heat in the National Basketball Association (NBA). During the off-season, the Heat signed free agents Kevin Gamble, Ledell Eackles and Brad Lohaus. Before the season started, Heat management decided to start pulling the plug on their core that dated back to the franchise's first season in 1988–89. It started by trading Rony Seikaly to the Golden State Warriors in exchange for Billy Owens. Miami then proceeded to trade Steve Smith and Grant Long to the Atlanta Hawks in exchange for Kevin Willis after the first two games. Despite the addition of Owens and Willis, the Heat stumbled out of the gate losing seven of their first eight games. After holding a 17–29 record at the All-Star break, head coach Kevin Loughery was fired, and replaced with assistant Alvin Gentry, as the Heat finished fourth in the Atlantic Division with a 32–50 record.

Glen Rice led the team in scoring averaging 22.3 points per game, while Willis averaged 17.1 points and 10.7 rebounds per game, and Owens provided the team with 14.3 points and 7.2 rebounds per game. In addition, Bimbo Coles provided with 10.0 points, 6.1 assists and 1.5 steals per game, while top draft pick Khalid Reeves contributed 9.2 points and 4.3 assists per game, Matt Geiger averaged 8.3 points and 5.6 rebounds per game, and John Salley contributed 7.3 points and 4.5 rebounds per game. 

This was Rice's final season with the Heat, as he was traded along with Geiger and Reeves to the Charlotte Hornets the following season. Meanwhile, Salley left in the 1995 NBA Expansion Draft, while Harold Miner was traded to the Cleveland Cavaliers, Eackles re-signed as a free agent with his former team, the Washington Bullets, Lohaus signed with the San Antonio Spurs, and Gentry was fired as head coach and was replaced by Pat Riley, who resigned from coaching the New York Knicks.

On April 15, 1995, Rice scored a career-high of 56 points in a 123–117 home win over the Orlando Magic, establishing a new franchise record that would stand until LeBron James's 61 points on March 3, 2014. During the All-Star Weekend in Phoenix, Rice won the Three-Point Shootout, and Miner won the Slam Dunk Contest for the second time.

Offseason

NBA Draft

Roster

Regular season

Season standings

Record vs. opponents

Game log

Regular season

|- align="center" bgcolor="#ffcccc"
| 24
| December 26, 19947:30p.m. EST
| Houston
| L 88–101
| Rice (20)
| Rice, Willis (7)
| Owens (6)
| Miami Arena15,200
| 8–16

|- align="center" bgcolor="#ffcccc"
| 32
| January 11, 19958:30p.m. EST
| @ Houston
| L 97–108
| Miner (19)
| Willis (9)
| Coles, Reeves (5)
| The Summit12,424
| 10–22

|- align="center"
|colspan="9" bgcolor="#bbcaff"|All-Star Break
|- style="background:#cfc;"
|- bgcolor="#bbffbb"

Player statistics

NOTE: Please write the players statistics in alphabetical order by last name.

Awards and records

Transactions
The Heat were involved in the following transactions during the 1994–95 season.

Trades

Free agents

Additions

Subtractions

Player Transactions Citation:

References

External links
 1994-95 Miami Heat

Miami Heat seasons
Miami Heat
Miami Heat
Miami Heat